4D Man (also known as The Evil Force in the UK; reissued as Master of Terror in the US) is a 1959 independent American science fiction film in color by De Luxe, produced by Jack H. Harris (from his original screenplay), directed by Irvin S. Yeaworth Jr., and starring Robert Lansing, Lee Meriwether, and James Congdon. The film was released by Universal-International.

Plot

A brilliant but irresponsible scientist, Dr. Tony Nelson, develops an electronic amplifier that he hopes will allow any object to achieve a 4th dimensional (4D) state. While in this state, any object can pass freely through any other object. Tony, however, fails to pay attention to the overload, which sparks an electrical fire that burns down his lab. This results in the university terminating his contract. Now unemployed, Tony seeks out his brother, Scott, also a Ph.D., to help him with his experiment. Scott is a researcher in a plant located in West Chester, Pennsylvania, and is working on a material called Cargonite that is so dense that it is impenetrable.

Scott is underpaid and unappreciated at his new job. He does not have the necessary drive to ask his employer, Mr. Carson, for greater recognition. Scott has become the driving force behind the development of Cargonite, named after Carson, who is now taking much of the credit for Scott's work. When his girlfriend, Linda Davis, falls for Tony, an enraged Scott steals Tony's experiment and starts playing around with it, eventually transforming himself into a 4D state. When demonstrating this to Tony, Scott leaves the amplifier power turned off, yet he successfully passes his hand through a block of steel. Scott can now enter a 4D state at will. Tony is amazed, but warns Scott not to reveal this ability until he can further test for possible side effects.

In the lab, Tony realizes what transpired on an earlier experiment of his; to fuse lead with gold. Tony realizes that through an extremely slow process the two substances can merge, and his experiment was to forge them immediately, which he realizes would break down the substances. While in the 4D state (signified by a 'shimmering' sound effect), Scott can pass through any solid object. He experiments with his new abilities by shoplifting a piece of fruit through a grocery store's solid window. Scott also notices a diamond necklace on display in a nearby jewelry store window, but decides against stealing it. When he sees a bank, however, his face breaks into a sly grin.
However, he soon discovers that the process ages him at a greatly accelerated rate. The aged Scott accidentally learns how to survive, when he visits the company doctor, who, to his horror, suddenly drops dead while examining him. He realises that by passing any part of his body through another person, Scott can drain anyone's lifeforce, thereby rejuvenating himself. 
The following day, news hits town that $50,000 was stolen from the bank with no sign of forced entry, nor any video footage of the crime. Strangely, a $1000 bill was found protruding from a solid piece of tempered steel, leaving the authorities perplexed. Tony realizes that Scott is abusing his power and tries to convince the police.

Scott starts using his newly-found power to acquire all the things he felt he was denied: money, recognition, power, and women. Scott confronts Carson, revealing the experiment, then taking his revenge "for the life drained from me" by literally draining Carson's lifeforce. Scott then proceeds to a sleazy bar, where he gets some street toughs to back down. When he goes to open the door his hand goes through it even though he didn't want to be intangible. With his newfound bravado he ignores this development; combined with his victory over the toughs and his ill-gotten money, he impresses a bar girl. When they later kiss Scott's power turns itself on again and the B-girl flees in horror now that she has rapidly aged, her blonde hair now white.

The police have to find a way to stop a man who is unstoppable. Looking very old now, Scott returns to the lab, but the police are unable to stop him, as well as a rival scientist who tried to steal Tony's work, whom Scott kills and thereby becomes less aged. Linda begs Scott to come to his senses. Scott kisses her, but unlike with the B-girl, his power is off and she has not aged. Linda then shoots Scott in solid form. Bleeding and feeling betrayed, Scott maniacally proclaims his invincibility and defiantly phase-shifts his body (albeit with difficulty) through a wall embedded with supposedly impenetrable Cargonite. "The End" appears on screen, followed a moment later by a question mark, which leaves Scott's fate undetermined.

Cast

 Robert Lansing as Dr. Scott Nelson
 Lee Meriwether as Linda Davis
 James Congdon as Dr. Tony Nelson
 Robert Strauss as Roy Parker
 Edgar Stehli as Dr. Theodore W. Carson
 Patty Duke as Marjorie Sutherland
 Guy Raymond as Fred
 Chic James as B-girl
 Elbert Smith as Capt. Rogers
 George Karas as Sgt. Todaman (como George Kara)
 Jasper Deeter as Dr. Welles
 Dean Newman as Dr. Brian Schwartz
 John Benson as reporter

Production and release
Jack H. Harris was able to begin production of the film with the money he had received from The Blob (1958) which was also directed by Yeaworth. It was the film debut of Lee Meriwether and Robert Lansing. Young Patty Duke also makes a small cameo appearance in the film.

Reception
On Rotten Tomatoes, the film has an approval rating of 80%, based on 5 reviews, with a 5.5/10 average.

See also
 Fourth dimension in literature
 "The Borderland"
 The Human Vapor

References

Bibliography
 Warren, Bill. Keep Watching the Skies: American Science Fiction Films of the Fifties, 21st Century Edition (revised and expanded). Jefferson, North Carolina: McFarland & Company, 2009. .

External links

 
 
 

1959 films
1959 horror films
American independent films
American science fiction horror films
Films about technology
Mad scientist films
1950s science fiction horror films
1950s English-language films
Universal Pictures films
1959 independent films
Films directed by Irvin Yeaworth
1950s American films